The 2008 Salt Lake County mayoral election was held to elect the Mayor of Salt Lake County, Utah on November 4, 2008, alongside the presidential, House of Representatives and gubernatorial elections. This marked the third election to the office since the post was created in 2000.

Popular incumbent Democrat Peter Corroon was elected in a nearly 2 to 1 landslide against token Republican opposition. In the same election cycle, Salt Lake County narrowly voted for Democrat Barack Obama for president, but also voted for incumbent Republican Governor Jon Huntsman Jr.

Candidates

Democratic Party
 Peter Corroon, incumbent county mayor

Republican Party
 Michael Renckert, field supervisor for Adult Probation and Parole at the Utah Department of Corrections

Dropped out
 Dell Schanze, businessman (switched to gubernatorial election, running as Libertarian)

Constitution Party
 Leonard Olds

Polling

Results

References

2008 Utah elections
2008 United States mayoral elections
2008 in Utah
2000s in Salt Lake City